Cassie is a feminine given name, nickname and surname. 

Cassie may also refer to:

 Cassie (album), Cassie Ventura's self-titled debut album
 "Cassie" (song), a song by Flyleaf about Cassie Bernall
 Cassie Ventura, singer
 "Cassie" (Skins series 1), an episode of the British television series Skins
 Cassie, a fragrance extracted from Acacia dealbata 
 Cassie, a fragrance extracted from Vachellia farnesiana

See also
 Roman cassie, a name for the ornamental tree Acacia caven
 Cassie's law, a formula for the contact angle of a droplet on a composite surface